The Attorney-General of Tasmania is a ministry of the Government of Tasmania with responsibility for the state's courts and tribunals. The Attorney General is a senior minister in the state government and the First Law Officer of the State.

The current Attorney-General of Tasmania, since March 2018, is Elise Archer of the Liberal Party.

List of attorneys-general of Tasmania

See also

 Justice ministry
 Government of Tasmania

References

Tasmania
Attorneys-General of Tasmania
Ministers of the Tasmanian state government